Autilla del Pino is a municipality located in the province of Palencia, Castile and León, Spain.

According to the 2004 census (INE), the municipality had a population of 243 inhabitants.

References

External links
Información, Historia y fotografías de Autilla del Pino

Municipalities in the Province of Palencia